Riencourtia is a genus of South American plants in the tribe Heliantheae within the family Asteraceae.

The generic name honors the birth name of Cassini's wife, Riencourt.

 Species
 Riencourtia latifolia Gardner - Venezuela, Guyana, Brazil
 Riencourtia longifolia Baker - Brazil
 Riencourtia oblongifolia Gardner - Brazil, Bolivia, Suriname
 Riencourtia pedunculosa (Rich.) Pruski - Venezuela, Guyana, Fr Guiana, Suriname, Brazil
 Riencourtia spiculifera Cass.
 Riencourtia tenuifolia Gardner - Brazil

References

Heliantheae
Asteraceae genera
Flora of South America